KCFG, virtual channel 9 (UHF digital channel 32), was an America One-affiliated television station licensed to Flagstaff, Arizona, United States. The station was owned by Skokie, Illinois-based KM Communications.

History
KCFG began with an original construction permit granted to KM Communications on February 10, 1997 to transmit from Mount Elden north of Flagstaff. Although KCFG was to be a full-service station, environmental restrictions at the transmitter site limited it to 1 kW ERP. The station went on-air December 20, 2000 and was licensed July 18, 2001. Immediately, KCFG applied to move their transmitter site to Mormon Mountain south of Flagstaff, intending to build both full 316 kW analog and 1,000 kW digital facilities there. However, the construction permit wasn't granted until nearly two years later and the analog facilities went unbuilt.

KCFG had originally elected to remain on channel 32 after the DTV transition in February 2009, but has since applied to the Federal Communications Commission (FCC) to move to VHF digital channel 9.

On November 6, 2012, the license assigned to KCFG was canceled and the call letters were deleted, due to the station's signal being silent since September 6, 2011.

FCC rule violations
The FCC proposed a $10,000 fine against KCFG in March 2006 because the station did not keep adequate records on commercial limits in children's TV programs. On March 9, 2007, the fine was reduced to $8,000 on the basis that the station had "a history of overall compliance with the Commission’s rules". The FCC eventually waived the fine on KCFG, but instead, KM was admonished "for its willful and repeated violation".

References

Television channels and stations established in 2000
CFG
Television channels and stations disestablished in 2011
Defunct television stations in the United States
2000 establishments in Arizona
2011 disestablishments in Arizona
CFG